Emil Viyachki (born 18 May 1990) is a Bulgarian professional footballer who plays as a defender for Slavia Sofia.

Career
Viyachki made his professional debut for Marek Dupnitsa in a match against Botev Vratsa in the B Group. Before that he played in amateur divisions with the club.

After the club was promoted to the A Group, Viyachki played in the first match for the team in the 1st league. In May 2020, Viyachki tested positive for COVID-19.

International career
Viyachki played for Bulgarian amateurs national team for the European Cup.

Career statistics

Club

References

External links

1990 births
Living people
Bulgarian footballers
Association football defenders
PFC Marek Dupnitsa players
OFC Pirin Blagoevgrad players
FC Lokomotiv 1929 Sofia players
FK Rabotnički players
PFC Slavia Sofia players
First Professional Football League (Bulgaria) players
People from Dupnitsa
Sportspeople from Kyustendil Province